Javontae Starks (born March 18, 1989) is an American professional boxer from Minneapolis, Minnesota.

Personal life
Starks has received much attention for his comeback from a serious injury.  In August 2007 Starks was shot in the leg in his hometown of Minneapolis, and the bullet nicked a major artery.  For a time it was uncertain whether he would survive the injury, but having done so Starks has recuperated and returned to competition.

Amateur Boxing Career
Starks competed as an amateur boxer from 2001 until 2009. Starks represented Circle of Discipline boxing club in Minneapolis.  He won his first major championships in 2003, and completed his amateur career having won the following regional and national championships:
2002 State Silver Gloves champion
2003 Ohio state champion
2003 Regional Silver Gloves champion
2003 Ringside World Champion
2003-2005 State JO champion
2003 and 2005 Regional JO Champion
2006 Region I Golden Gloves champion
2006 Silver Medalist in the Under 19 Tournament
2007 Finalist Ringside World Tournament
2008 State USA champion
2008 Upper Midwest Golden Gloves champion
2008 Future Stars national champion
2009 Upper Midwest Golden Gloves champion

Professional boxing career
It was announced on October 5, 2009, that Starks had spurned advances from promoters Main Events (New Jersey) and TKO Productions (Las Vegas) to sign a contract with Minnesota promoter, Midwest Sports Council.  Starks made his professional debut on November 13, 2009, with a second-round knockout of Dan Copp.

References

1989 births
Living people
Welterweight boxers
Boxers from Minnesota
American male boxers